Conte is a literary genre of tales, often short, characterized by fantasy or wit. They were popular in the seventeenth and eighteenth centuries until the genre became merged with the short story in the nineteenth century. Distinguishing contes from other literary genres is notoriously difficult due to the various meanings of the French term  that span folktales, fairy tales, short stories, oral tales, and fables.

Definition
Conte comes from the French word , "to relate". The French term conte encompasses a wide range of narrative forms that are not limited to written accounts. No clear English equivalent for conte exists in English as it includes folktales, fairy tales, short stories, oral tales, and to lesser extent fables. This makes conte notoriously difficult to define precisely.

A conte is generally longer than a short story but shorter than a novel. In this sense, contes can be called novellas. Contes are contrasted with short stories not only in length but subject matter. Whereas short stories are about recent ("novel") events, contes tend to be either fairy tales or philosophical stories. , too, could be oral. Contes are often adventure stories, characterized by fantasy, wit, and satire. It may have moral or philosophical underpinnings, but is generally not interested in psychological depth or circumstantial detail. They may be profound, but not "weighty". These generic characteristics also contribute to their short length. Contes can be either in prose or verse.

History

Contes were popular in the seventeenth and eighteenth centuries. The distinction between contes and short stories was largely obsolete by the nineteenth century when the genres became merged. Reflective of this, the English term "short story" was coined in 1884 by Brander Matthews.

However, according to Edmund Gosse, "those brilliant stories" by Voltaire – Candide, Zadig, L'Ingénu, and The White Bull – "are not, in the modern sense,  at all. While it is possible that Voltaire drew inspiration to his contes from an oral source, namely his performances to Louise Bénédicte de Bourbon early in his career, he only published contes after his exile.

Francophone contes also exist outside of France. For instance, Lafcadio Hearn incorporated creole contes in his works.

See also
 Anthology
 Conte cruel
 Drabble
 Flash fiction, also known as microfiction
 Irish short story
 Literary journal
 Minisaga
 Sketch story
 Tall tale
 Vignette

References

Citations

Works cited
 
 
 
 
 
 
 
 
 
 
 
 

Fiction forms
Literary genres